The 2016 Kaiserstuhl-Cup (known as the AXA Kaiserstuhl-Cup for sponsorship reasons) was the 32nd edition of the summer football friendly tournament, organised by German club Bahlinger SC. It was hosted at the Kaiserstuhlstadion in Bahlingen, from 6 to 7 August 2016. Besides the hosts, four other German teams took part: SC Freiburg, Darmstadt 98, Offenburger FV, and SV Endingen. SC Freiburg won the Kaiserstuhl-Cup after winning both of their matches.

Overview

Participants

Standings
Freiburg, Bahlingen, and Offenburg played two matches, while Darmstadt and Endingen played one.

Matches

References

External links 
 

2016–17 in German football